The 1954 Macdonald Brier, the Canadian men's national curling championship, was held from March 1 to 5, 1954 at Edmonton Gardens in Edmonton, Alberta. A total of 32,000 fans attended the event.

Team Alberta, who was skipped by Matt Baldwin became the third team to win Brier Tankard in their hometown as they finished round robin play with a 9-1 record. This was Alberta's fifth Brier championship and the first of three by Baldwin as a skip. At age 27, Baldwin would also at the time be the youngest skip to win a Brier. 

Baldwin is also remembered for pleasing the cheering hometown Edmonton crowd as during their final game against New Brunswick, he slid halfway down the sheet of ice when throwing his final rock of the event, which was legal under curling rules at the time, but was never attempted. The rock stopped right on the button, cementing Baldwin's status as a "rock star".

Teams
The teams are listed as follows:

Round robin standings

Round robin results
All draw times are listed in Mountain Time (UTC-07:00)

Draw 1
Monday, March 1 3:00 PM

Draw 2
Monday, March 1 8:00 PM

Draw 3
Tuesday, March 2 9:00 AM

Draw 4
Tuesday, March 2 2:30 PM

Draw 5
Wednesday, March 3 3:00 PM

Draw 6
Wednesday, March 3 8:00 PM

Draw 7
Thursday, March 4 9:30 AM

Draw 8
Thursday, March 4 3:00 PM

Draw 9
Thursday, March 4 8:00 PM

Draw 10
Friday, March 5 9:30 AM

Draw 11
Friday, March 5 2:30 PM

References

External links 
 Video: 

Macdonald Brier, 1954
Macdonald Brier, 1954
The Brier
Curling competitions in Edmonton
Macdonald Brier
Macdonald Brier
20th century in Edmonton